Kryštof Bogar is a Czech mountain bike orienteering competitor and World Champion. He won a gold medal and a bronze medal at the 2013 World MTB Orienteering Championships.

References

 Kryštof Bogar celkovým vítězem SP 2017 at MTBO.cz, 26 August 2017

Czech orienteers
Male orienteers
Czech male cyclists
Mountain bike orienteers
Year of birth missing (living people)
Living people
Place of birth missing (living people)